Sexsmith may refer to:

People 
 Ron Sexsmith, a Canadian singer-songwriter
 Ron Sexsmith (album), Ron Sexsmith's debut Album
 Toby Sexsmith, a politician in Manitoba, Canada
 Tyson Sexsmith, a goalie for the Vancouver Giants

Places
 Sexsmith, Alberta, a town in Alberta, Canada
 Sexsmith/Exeter Airport, an airport
 J. W. Sexsmith Elementary School, a public school in Vancouver Canada
 Sexsmith Secondary School, a public school in Sexsmith Canada